Mother Joseph is a bronze sculpture depicting Mother Joseph Pariseau by Felix de Weldon, installed in the United States Capitol Visitor Center's Emancipation Hall, in Washington, D.C., as part of the National Statuary Hall Collection. The statue was gifted by the U.S. state of Washington in 1980.

See also
 1980 in art

References

External links
 

1980 establishments in Washington, D.C.
1980 sculptures
Bronze sculptures in Washington, D.C.
Monuments and memorials in Washington, D.C.
National Statuary Hall Collection
Sculptures of women in Washington, D.C.